Bernd Sturmfels (born March 28, 1962 in Kassel, West Germany) is a Professor of Mathematics and Computer Science at the University of California, Berkeley and is a director of the Max Planck Institute for Mathematics in the Sciences in Leipzig since 2017.

Education and career
He received his PhD in 1987 from the University of Washington and the Technische Universität Darmstadt. After two postdoctoral years at the Institute for Mathematics and its Applications in Minneapolis, Minnesota, and the Research Institute for Symbolic Computation in Linz, Austria, he taught at Cornell University, before joining University of California, Berkeley in 1995. His Ph.D. students include Melody Chan, Jesús A. De Loera, Mike Develin, Diane Maclagan, Rekha R. Thomas, Caroline Uhler, and Cynthia Vinzant.

Contributions
Bernd Sturmfels has made contributions to a variety of areas of mathematics, including algebraic geometry, commutative algebra, discrete geometry, Gröbner bases, toric varieties, tropical geometry, algebraic statistics, and computational biology. He has written several highly cited papers in algebra with Dave Bayer.

He has authored or co-authored multiple books including Introduction to tropical geometry with Diane Maclagan.

Awards and honors
Sturmfels' honors include a National Young Investigator Fellowship, an Alfred P. Sloan Fellowship, and a David and Lucile Packard Fellowship. In 1999 he received a Lester R. Ford Award for his expository article Polynomial equations and convex polytopes. He was awarded a Miller Research Professorship at the University of California Berkeley for 2000–2001. In 2018, he was awarded the George David Birkhoff Prize in Applied Mathematics.

In 2012, he became a fellow of the American Mathematical Society.

References

Further reading

External links
 Homepage at Berkeley
 
 

1962 births
Living people
Scientists from Kassel
20th-century German mathematicians
20th-century American mathematicians
21st-century American mathematicians
University of Washington alumni
Fellows of the American Mathematical Society
UC Berkeley College of Engineering faculty
Fellows of the Society for Industrial and Applied Mathematics
Mathematics popularizers
Technische Universität Darmstadt alumni
Algebraic geometers
Combinatorialists
Sloan Research Fellows
Algebraists
Cornell University faculty
21st-century German mathematicians
Academic staff of Max Planck Society
Max Planck Institute directors